Second-seeded Tony Trabert defeated Arthur D. Larsen 6–4, 7–5, 6–1 in the final to win the men's singles tennis title at the 1954 French Championships.

Seeds
The seeded players are listed below. Tony Trabert is the champion; others show the round in which they were eliminated.

  Lew Hoad (fourth round)
  Tony Trabert (champion)
  Ken Rosewall (fourth round)
  Vic Seixas (quarterfinals)
  Jaroslav Drobný (fourth round)
  Budge Patty (semifinals)
  Mervyn Rose (quarterfinals)
  Enrique Morea (semifinals)
  Philippe Washer (fourth round)
  Kurt Nielsen (second round)
  Jacques Brichant (fourth round)
  Art Larsen (final)
  Rex Hartwig (fourth round)
  Sven Davidson (quarterfinals)
  Robert Falkenburg (fourth round)
  Gardnar Mulloy (quarterfinals)

Draw

Key
 Q = Qualifier
 WC = Wild card
 LL = Lucky loser
 r = Retired

Finals

Earlier rounds

Section 1

Section 2

Section 3

Section 4

Section 5

Section 6

Section 7

Section 8

External links
   on the French Open website
 1954 French Championships, ATP

1954
1954 in French tennis